The 2011 Los Angeles Angels of Anaheim season was the franchise's 51st season and 46th in Anaheim. The Angels began the season following a disappointing 2010 campaign where they missed the postseason for the first time since 2006, after winning the American League West three times in a row from 2007 to 2009. During the 2011 season, the Angels celebrated the franchise's 50th anniversary and because it was the "golden Anniversary", a gold trim was added to the uniforms including the halo on both the cap and uniform (the halo from 1993 to 1996, 2002–2010 was silver and gold prior to that). The date of the franchise's actual 50th anniversary is December 6, 2010. The season saw the debut of Mike Trout, who made his major league debut on July 8, 2011. Although he batted  .220 during his brief time on the year, he would be back the following season as the regular fielder for the team.

2010–11 offseason
After an incredibly disappointing 2010 season, the Angels' priority in the offseason was to fix what went horribly wrong so the team can return to the postseason in 2011. Owner Arte Moreno has gone on record saying that money will not be an issue, and that he is willing to spend as much as possible to put a winning product on the field. Going into the offseason, the Angels had both Hideki Matsui and Scot Shields eligible for free agency with Kendrys Morales, Jered Weaver, Erick Aybar, Howie Kendrick, Kevin Frandsen, Alberto Callaspo, Reggie Willits, and Mike Napoli being arbitration eligible. As of December 3, 2010, the Angels have declined to offer Matsui arbitration, tendered contracts to Morales, Weaver, Aybar, Kendrick, Callaspo, Willits, and Napoli. The Angels also declined to tender a contract to Frandsen, who would become a free agent, and Shields, who would retire from baseball.

The Angels expressed interest in Rays outfielder Carl Crawford, Red Sox third baseman Adrián Beltré, Rays closer Rafael Soriano, Phillies outfielder Jayson Werth, and were considered a wildcard in the Cliff Lee sweepstakes. On December 2, 2010, the Angels signed former Mets reliever Hisanori Takahashi in their first move of the offseason. then signed Blue Jays reliever Scott Downs, and also acquired outfielder Vernon Wells from Toronto in exchange for outfielder Juan Rivera and catcher Mike Napoli.

Regular season
See the game log below for detailed game-by-game regular season information.

The season for the Angels began Thursday, March 31 with a road game against Kansas City.  Their first home game was Friday, April 8 against Toronto.  Their longest homestand will be from June 27 – July 10 (13 home games), and their longest road trip will be June 13–26 (12 road games).  Their final game of the regular season will be on Wednesday, September 28 at home against Rangers.

March/April
After winning the first game of the season against Kansas City, the Angels stumbled dropping their next three games against that same Royals team. The Halos led at one point in each of those three losses and the suspect bullpen was a large reason why they dropped those three in a row. After the Kansas City series, manager Mike Scioscia shook up the bullpen by demoting Fernando Rodney from the closer's role and giving Jordan Walden that position. The Angels proceeded to sweep the Tampa Bay Rays in St. Petersburg and win and go 4–2 on their opening homestand against the Blue Jays and Indians. The Angels winning ways continued into their second road trip of the season sweeping the Chicago White Sox and taking 2 of 3 from division rival Texas and taking sole control of first in the American League West. However, the Angels hit a wall when they returned home to Angel Stadium being swept by arch-rival Boston in a four-game series and only scoring a total of five runs over that four game stretch. Texas, in the meantime took back the top spot in the AL West. After their abysmal showing against Boston, the Angels rebounded slightly by taking 2 of 3 from division rival Oakland finishing out the homestand 2–5. Going back to Tampa Bay, the Angels took the series 2–1 only losing the second game of the series on a wild pitch by relief pitcher Fernando Rodney in the 10th inning. The second game of the series also featured Joel Piñeiro's first start of the season where he only gave up one run over 7 innings pitched.

May
The Angels started out the month of May by finishing off a series with Tampa Bay that they won 2–1. After that series, the Angels flew to Boston to take on the team that swept them in Anaheim just a week prior. The Halos ended up dropping the first two games of that series, but ended up winning the third game of the series in a marathon 13 inning game that lasted 7 hours and 35 minutes thanks to a 2-hour and 35 minute rain delay. In the fourth game, the Angels pounded out 8 runs off of their former ace John Lackey and ended up winning the game 11–0 to earn the series split 2–2. Returning home to Anaheim where the Angels had a 6–7 mark, they were to face the red-hot Cleveland Indians in a three-game series. They won the first game in extra innings behind an excellent outing by rookie Tyler Chatwood and the bullpen, however the Angels then proceeded to drop the second game of the series. They did win the rubber game of the series on Mother's Day in a game that saw the lead change many times. The win against the Indians on May 8, marked manager Mike Scioscia's 1,000th career victory (all of which were with the Angels).

Schedule and results

Regular season

|- align="center" bgcolor="#bbffbb"
| 1 || March 31 || @ Royals || 4–2 || Weaver (1–0) || Hochevar (0–1) || Rodney (1) || 40,055 || 1–0 || Kauffman Stadium || W1 || bgcolor="bbffbb" | +
|- 

|- align="center" bgcolor="#ffbbbb"
| 2 || April 1 || @ Royals || 2–1 || Soria (1–0) || Kohn (0–1) ||  || 13,302 || 1–1 || Kauffman Stadium || L1 || bgcolor="ffbbbb" | −
|- align="center" bgcolor="#ffbbbb"
| 3 || April 2 || @ Royals || 5–4 || Crow (1–0) || Jepsen (0–1) || Soria (1) || 17,328 || 1–2 || Kauffman Stadium || L2 || bgcolor="ffbbbb" | −
|- align="center" bgcolor="#ffbbbb"
| 4 || April 3 || @ Royals || 12–9 (13) || Collins (1–0) || Bulger (0–1) ||  || 14,085 || 1–3 || Kauffman Stadium || L3 || bgcolor="ffbbbb" | −
|- align="center" bgcolor="#bbffbb"
| 5 || April 5 || @ Rays || 5–3 || Weaver (2–0) || Niemann (0–1) || Walden (1) || 13,173 || 2–3 || Tropicana Field || W1 || bgcolor="ffbbbb" | −3
|- align="center" bgcolor="#bbffbb"
| 6 || April 6 || @ Rays || 5–1 || Haren (1–0) || Hellickson (0–1) ||  || 11,836 || 3–3 || Tropicana Field || W2 || bgcolor="ffbbbb" | −3
|- align="center" bgcolor="#ffbbbb"
| 7 || April 8 || Blue Jays || 3–2 || Dotel (1–0) || Santana (0–1) || Rauch (2) || 43,853 || 3–4 || Angel Stadium of Anaheim || L1 || bgcolor="ffbbbb" | −
|- align="center" bgcolor="#bbffbb"
| 8 || April 9 || Blue Jays || 6–5 (14) || Haren (2–0) || Rauch (0–1) ||  || 43,513 || 4–4 || Angel Stadium of Anaheim || W1 || bgcolor="ffbbbb" | −3
|- align="center" bgcolor="#bbffbb"
| 9 || April 10 || Blue Jays || 3–1 || Weaver (3–0) || Reyes (0–1) || Rodney (2) || 43,525 || 5–4 || Angel Stadium of Anaheim || W2 || bgcolor="ffbbbb" | −3
|- align="center" bgcolor="#ffbbbb"
| 10 || April 11 || Indians || 4–0 || Talbot (1–0) || Chatwood (0–1) ||  || 32,864 || 5–5 || Angel Stadium of Anaheim || L1 || bgcolor="ffbbbb" | −4
|- align="center" bgcolor="#bbffbb"
| 11 || April 12 || Indians || 2–0 || Haren (3–0) || Carmona (0–2) ||  || 43,529 || 6–5 || Angel Stadium of Anaheim || W1 || bgcolor="ffbbbb" | −3
|- align="center" bgcolor="#bbffbb"
| 12 || April 13 || Indians || 4–3 || Takahashi (1–0) || Durbin (1–0) ||  || 31,049 || 7–5 || Angel Stadium of Anaheim || W2 || bgcolor="ffbbbb" | −2
|- align="center" bgcolor="#bbffbb"
| 13 || April 15 || @ White Sox || 4–3 || Weaver (4–0) || Humber (1–1) || Walden (2) || 20,103 || 8–5 || U.S. Cellular Field || W3 || bgcolor="ffbbbb" | −2
|- align="center" bgcolor="#bbffbb"
| 14 || April 16 || @ White Sox || 7–2 || Chatwood (1–1) || Floyd (1–1) ||  || 21,250 || 9–5 || U.S. Cellular Field || W4 || bgcolor="ffbbbb" | −1
|- align="center" bgcolor="#bbffbb"
| 15 || April 17 || @ White Sox || 4–2 || Haren (4–0)  || Buehrle (1–1) || Walden (3) || 23,458 || 10–5 || U.S. Cellular Field || W5 || bgcolor="f2f2f2" | 0
|- align="center" bgcolor="#ffbbbb"
| 16 || April 18 || @ Rangers || 7–1 || Wilson (2–0) || Santana (0–2) ||  || 30,799 || 10–6 || Rangers Ballpark in Arlington || L1 || bgcolor="f2f2f2" | −1
|- align="center" bgcolor="#bbffbb"
| 17 || April 19 || @ Rangers || 15–4 || Palmer (0–0) || Lewis (1–2) ||  || 22,450 || 11–6 || Rangers Ballpark in Arlington || W1 || bgcolor="f2f2f2" | 0
|- align="center" bgcolor="#bbffbb"
| 18 || April 20 || @ Rangers || 4–1 || Weaver (5–0) || Harrison (3–1) ||  || 31,967 || 12–6 || Rangers Ballpark in Arlington || W2 || bgcolor="bbffbb" | +1
|- align="center" bgcolor="#ffbbbb" 
| 19 || April 21 || Red Sox || 4–2 (11) || Jenks (1–1) || Thompson (0–1) ||  || 37,003 || 12–7 || Angel Stadium of Anaheim || L1 || bgcolor="bbffbb" | +
|- align="center" bgcolor="#ffbbbb" 
| 20 || April 22 || Red Sox || 4–3 || Lester (2–1) || Haren (4–1) || Papelbon (5) || 39,005 || 12–8 || Angel Stadium of Anaheim || L2 || bgcolor="f2f2f2" | −
|- align="center" bgcolor="#ffbbbb"
| 21 || April 23 || Red Sox || 5–0 || Matsuzaka (2–2) || Santana (0–3) ||  || 40,025 || 12–9 || Angel Stadium of Anaheim|| L3 || bgcolor="f2f2f2" | − 
|- align="center" bgcolor="#ffbbbb"
| 22 || April 24 || Red Sox || 7–0 || Lackey (2–2) || Palmer (1–1) ||  || 35,107 || 12–10 || Angel Stadium of Anaheim || L4 || bgcolor="f2f2f2" | −
|- align="center" bgcolor="#bbffbb"
| 23 || April 25 || Athletics || 5–0 || Weaver (6–0) || Gonzalez (2–2) ||  || 37,115 || 13–10 || Angel Stadium of Anaheim || W1 || bgcolor="bbcaff" | −
|- align="center" bgcolor="#bbffbb"
| 24 || April 26 || Athletics || 8–3 || Chatwood (2–1) || McCarthy (1–2) ||  || 37,228 || 14–10 || Angel Stadium of Anaheim || W2 || bgcolor="bbcaff" | −
|- align="center" bgcolor="#ffbbbb"
| 25 || April 27 || Athletics || 2–1 (10) || Fuentes (1–2) || Walden (0–1) || Ziegler (1) || 37,247 || 14–11 || Angel Stadium of Anaheim || L1 || bgcolor="bbcaff" | −
|- align="center" bgcolor="#bbffbb"
| 26 || April 29 || @ Rays || 8–5 || Santana (1–3) || Price (3–3) || Walden (4) || 21,791 || 15–11 || Tropicana Field  || W1 || bgcolor="f2f2f2" | 0
|- align="center" bgcolor="#ffbbbb"
| 27 || April 30 || @ Rays || 2–1 (10) || Peralta (1–0) || Rodney (0–1) ||  || 20,245 || 15–12 || Tropicana Field || L1 || bgcolor="f2f2f2" | −1
|-    

|- 
|- align="center" bgcolor="#bbffbb"
| 28 || May 1 || @ Rays || 6–5 || Thompson (1–1) || Peralta (1–1) || Walden (5) || 16,248 || 16–12 || Tropicana Field || W1 || bgcolor="f2f2f2" | 0
|- align="center" bgcolor="#ffbbbb"
| 29 || May 2 || @ Red Sox || 9–5 || Buchholz (2–3) || Weaver (6–1) || || 37,017 || 16–13 || Fenway Park || L1 || bgcolor="f2f2f2" | 0
|- align="center" bgcolor="#ffbbbb"
| 30 || May 3 || @ Red Sox || 7–3 || Lester (4–1) || Haren (4–2) || || 37,043 ||16–14 ||  Fenway Park || L2 || bgcolor="f2f2f2" | 0
|- align="center" bgcolor="#bbffbb"
| 31 || May 4 || @ Red Sox || 5–3 (13) || Bell (1–0) || Matsuzaka (2–3) ||  || 37,037 || 17–14 || Fenway Park || W1 || bgcolor="f2f2f2" | 0
|- align="center" bgcolor="#bbffbb"
| 32 || May 5 || @ Red Sox || 11–0 || Piñeiro (1–0) || Lackey (2–4) ||  || 37,013 || 18–14 || Fenway Park || W2 || bgcolor="bbffbb" | +1
|- align="center" bgcolor="#bbffbb"
| 33 || May 6 || Indians || 2–1 (11) || Rodney (1–1) || Germano (0–1) ||  || 36,447 || 19–14 || Angel Stadium of Anaheim || W3 || bgcolor="bbffbb" | +2
|- align="center" bgcolor="#ffbbbb"
| 34 || May 7 || Indians || 4–3 || White (1–0) || Weaver (6–2) || Perez (10) || 37,684 || 19–15 || Angel Stadium of Anaheim || L1 || bgcolor="bbffbb" | +1
|- align="center" bgcolor="#bbffbb"
| 35 || May 8 || Indians || 6–5 || Rodney (2–1) || Smith (1–1) || Walden (6) || 40,124 || 20–15 || Angel Stadium of Anaheim || W1 || bgcolor="bbffbb" | +2
|- align="center" bgcolor="#ffbbbb"
| 36 || May 9 || White Sox || 8–0 || Jackson (3–4) || Santana (1–4) ||  || 38,561 || 20–16 || Angel Stadium of Anaheim || L1 || bgcolor="bbffbb" | +1
|- align="center" bgcolor="#bbffbb"
| 37 || May 10 || White Sox || 6–2 || Piñeiro (2–0) || Danks (0–6) ||  || 40,128 || 21–16 || Angel Stadium of Anaheim|| W1 || bgcolor="bbffbb" | +2
|- align="center" bgcolor="#ffbbbb"
| 38 || May 11 || White Sox || 6–4 || Santos (2–0) || Jepsen (0–2) || Thornton (1) || 39,151 || 21–17 || Angel Stadium of Anaheim || L1 || bgcolor="bbffbb" | +
|- align="center" bgcolor="#ffbbbb"
| 39 || May 13 || @ Rangers || 4–1 || Ogando (4–0) || Weaver (6–3) || Feliz (7) || 45,995 || 21–18 || Rangers Ballpark in Arlington || L2 || bgcolor="bbffbb" | +
|- align="center" bgcolor="#bbffbb"
| 40 || May 14 || @ Rangers || 3–2 || Downs (1–0) || Oliver (1–4) || Walden (7) || 47,663 || 22–18 || Rangers Ballpark in Arlington || W1 || bgcolor="bbffbb" | +
|- align="center" bgcolor="#ffbbbb"
| 41 || May 15 || @ Rangers || 5–4 || Lowe (1–0) || Thompson (1–2) || Feliz (8) || 48,284 || 22–19 || Rangers Ballpark in Arlington || L1 || bgcolor="bbffbb" | +
|- align="center" bgcolor="#ffbbbb"
| 42 || May 16 || @ Athletics || 5–4 (10) || Balfour (3–1) || Rodney (2–2) ||  || 11,061 || 22–20 || Oakland–Alameda County Coliseum || L2 || bgcolor="ffbbbb" | −
|- align="center" bgcolor="#ffbbbb"
| 43 || May 17 || @ Athletics || 14–0 || Gonzalez (5–2) || Chatwood (2–2) ||  || 12,190 || 22–21 || Oakland–Alameda County Coliseum || L3 || bgcolor="ffbbbb" | −
|- align="center" bgcolor="#ffbbbb"
| 44 || May 18 || @ Mariners || 3–0 || Vargas (3–2) || Weaver (6–4) || League (10) || 16,992 || 22–22 || Safeco Field || L4 || bgcolor="ffbbbb" | −
|- align="center" bgcolor="#ffbbbb"
| 45 || May 19 || @ Mariners || 2–1 || Pauley (2–0) || Downs (1–1) ||  || 18,374 || 22–23 || Safeco Field || L5 || bgcolor="ffbbbb" | −
|- align="center" bgcolor="#bbffbb"
| 46 || May 20 || Braves || 9–0 || Santana (2–4) || Hudson (4–4) ||  || 40,211 || 23–23 || Angel Stadium of Anaheim || W1 || bgcolor="ffbbbb" | −
|- align="center" bgcolor="#ffbbbb"
| 47 || May 21 || Braves || 5–4 (12) || Proctor (1–0) || Bell (1–1) || Kimbrel (12) || 43,511 || 23–24 || Angel Stadium of Anaheim || L1 || bgcolor="ffbbbb" | −
|- align="center" bgcolor="#bbffbb"
| 48 || May 22 || Braves || 4–1 || Chatwood (3–2) || Lowe (3–4) || Walden (8) || 40,098 || 24–24 || Angel Stadium of Anaheim || W1 || bgcolor="ffbbbb" | −
|- align="center" bgcolor="#bbffbb"
| 49 || May 23 || Athletics || 4–1 || Downs (2–1) || Fuentes (1–7) || Walden (9) || 36,215 || 25–24 || Angel Stadium of Anaheim || W2 || bgcolor="ffbbbb" | −
|- align="center" bgcolor="#ffbbbb"
| 50 || May 24 || Athletics || 6–1 || Moscoso (1–0) || Haren (4–3) ||  || 39,117 || 25–25 || Angel Stadium of Anaheim || L1 || bgcolor="ffbbbb" | −
|- align="center" bgcolor="#bbffbb"
| 51 || May 25 || Athletics || 4–1 || Santana (3–4) || Cahill (6–2) || Walden (10) || 40,253 || 26–25 || Angel Stadium of Anaheim || W1 || bgcolor="ffbbbb" | −
|- align="center" bgcolor="#ffbbbb"
| 52 || May 26 || Athletics || 4–3 || Anderson (3–4) || Piñeiro (2–1) ||  || 33,412 || 26–26 || Angel Stadium of Anaheim || L1 || bgcolor="ffbbbb" | −1
|- align="center" bgcolor="#bbffbb"
| 53 || May 27 || @ Twins || 6–5 || Downs (3–1) || Hoey (0–2) || Walden (11) || 38,976 || 27–26 || Target Field || W1 || bgcolor="f2f2f2" | 0
|- align="center" bgcolor="#ffbbbb"
| 54 || May 28 || @ Twins || 1–0 || Burnett (1–3) || Takahashi (1–1) ||  || 39,824 || 27–27 || Target Field || L1 || bgcolor="ffbbbb" | −1
|- align="center" bgcolor="#bbffbb"
| 55 || May 29 || @ Twins || 6–5 || Haren (5–3) || Pavano (2–5) || Walden (12) || 39,867 || 28–27 || Target Field || W1 || bgcolor="ffbbbb" | −1
|- align="center" bgcolor="#bbffbb"
| 56 || May 30 || @ Royals || 10–8 || Jepsen (1–2) || Soria (3–3) || Rodney (3) || 24,406 || 29–27 || Kauffman Stadium || W2 || bgcolor="ffbbbb" | −1
|- align="center" bgcolor="#ffbbbb"
| 57 || May 31 || @ Royals || 7–3 || Francis (2–5) || Piñeiro (2–2) ||  || 14,174 || 29–28 || Kauffman Stadium || L1 || bgcolor="ffbbbb" | −1
|-

|- align="center" bgcolor="#ffbbbb"
| 58 || June 1 || @ Royals || 2–0 || Collins (3–2) || Downs (3–2) ||  || 12,022 || 29–29 || Kauffman Stadium || L2 || bgcolor="ffbbbb" | −2
|- align="center" bgcolor="#bbffbb"
| 59 || June 3 || Yankees || 3–2 || Weaver (7–4) || Nova (4–4) || Walden (13) || 42,521 || 30–29 || Angel Stadium of Anaheim || W1 || bgcolor="ffbbbb" | −
|- align="center" bgcolor="#ffbbbb"
| 60 || June 4 || Yankees || 3–2 || Sabathia (7–3) || Santana (3–5) || Rivera (15) || 43,619 || 30–30 || Angel Stadium of Anaheim || L1 || bgcolor="ffbbbb" | −
|- align="center" bgcolor="#ffbbbb"
| 61 || June 5 || Yankees || 5–3 || Colón (4–3) || Piñeiro (2–3) || Rivera (16) || 43,524 || 30–31 || Angel Stadium of Anaheim || L2 || bgcolor="ffbbbb" | −
|- align="center" bgcolor="#ffbbbb"
| 62 || June 6 || Rays || 5–1 || Price (7–5) || Chatwood (3–3) ||  || 32,287 || 30–32 || Angel Stadium of Anaheim || L3 || bgcolor="ffbbbb" | −
|- align="center" bgcolor="#ffbbbb"
| 63 || June 7 || Rays || 4–1 || Cobb (1–0) || Haren (5–4) || Farnsworth (12) || 38,833 || 30–33 || Angel Stadium of Anaheim || L4 || bgcolor="ffbbbb" | −
|- align="center" bgcolor="#ffbbbb"
| 64 || June 8 || Rays || 4–3 || Cruz (3–0) || Rodney (2–3) || Farnsworth (13) || 33,157 || 30–34 || Angel Stadium of Anaheim || L5 || bgcolor="ffbbbb" | −
|- align="center" bgcolor="#ffbbbb"
| 65 || June 10 || Royals || 4–2 || Francis (3–6) || Santana (3–6) || Soria (9) || 38,254 || 30–35 || Angel Stadium of Anaheim || L6 || bgcolor="ffbbbb" | −6
|- align="center" bgcolor="#bbffbb"
| 66 || June 11 || Royals || 7–5 || Downs (4–2) || Collins (3–3) || Walden (14) || 38,911 || 31–35 || Angel Stadium of Anaheim || W1 || bgcolor="ffbbbb" | −5
|- align="center" bgcolor="#ffbbbb"
| 67 || June 12 || Royals || 9–0 || Mazzaro (1–1) || Chatwood (3–4) ||  || 39,114 || 31–36 || Angel Stadium of Anaheim || L1 || bgcolor="ffbbbb" | −5
|- align="center" bgcolor="#bbffbb"
| 68 || June 13 || @ Mariners || 6–3 || Haren (6–4) || Vargas (4–4) || Walden (15) || 20,238 || 32–36 || Safeco Field || W1 || bgcolor="ffbbbb" | −
|- align="center" bgcolor="#bbffbb"
| 69 || June 14 || @ Mariners || 4–0 || Weaver (8–4) || Fister (3–8) ||  || 17,634 || 33–36 || Safeco Field || W2 || bgcolor="ffbbbb" | −
|- align="center" bgcolor="#ffbbbb"
| 70 || June 15 || @ Mariners || 3–1 || Bédard (4–4) || Santana (3–7) || League (19) || 19,321 || 33–37 || Safeco Field || L1 || bgcolor="ffbbbb" | −
|- align="center" bgcolor="#bbffbb"
| 71 || June 17 || @ Mets || 4–3 || Piñeiro (3–3) || Capuano (5–7) || Walden (16) || 29,513 || 34–37 || Citi Field || W1 || bgcolor="ffbbbb" | −3
|- align="center" bgcolor="#ffbbbb"
| 72 || June 18 || @ Mets || 6–1 || Pelfrey (4–5) || Haren (6–5) ||  || 31,538 || 34–38 || Citi Field || L1 || bgcolor="ffbbbb" | −4
|- align="center" bgcolor="#bbffbb"
| 73 || June 19 || @ Mets || 7–3 || Chatwood (4–4) || Niese (6–6) ||  || 36,213 || 35–38 || Citi Field || W1 || bgcolor="ffbbbb" | −3
|- align="center" bgcolor="#bbffbb"
| 74 || June 20 || @ Marlins || 2–1 || Weaver (9–4) || Cishek (0–1) || Walden (17) || 16,984 || 36–38 || Sun Life Stadium || W2 || bgcolor="ffbbbb" | −3
|- align="center" bgcolor="#ffbbbb"
| 75 || June 21 || @ Marlins || 5–2 || Vázquez  (4–7) || Santana (3–8) || Núñez (20) || 17,344 || 36–39 || Sun Life Stadium || L1 || bgcolor="ffbbbb" | −4
|- align="center" bgcolor="#bbffbb"
| 76 || June 22 || @ Marlins || 6–5 || Walden (1–1) || Badenhop (1–1) || Kohn (1) || 19,721 || 37–39 || Sun Life Stadium || W1 || bgcolor="ffbbbb" | −3
|- align="center" bgcolor="#bbffbb"
| 77 || June 24 || @ Dodgers || 8–3 || Haren (7–5) || De La Rosa (3–2) ||  || 43,640 || 38–39 || Dodger Stadium || W2 || bgcolor="ffbbbb" | −3
|- align="center" bgcolor="#bbffbb"
| 78 || June 25 || @ Dodgers || 6–1 || Chatwood (5–4) || Kuroda (5–9) ||  || 41,108 || 39–39 || Dodger Stadium || W2 || bgcolor="ffbbbb" | −2
|- align="center" bgcolor="#ffbbbb"
| 79 || June 26 || @ Dodgers || 3–2 || Kershaw (8–3) || Walden (1–2) ||  || 43,104 || 39–40 || Dodger Stadium || L1 || bgcolor="ffbbbb" | −2
|- align="center" bgcolor="#bbffbb"
| 80 || June 27 || Nationals || 4–3 (10) || Downs (5–2) || Burnett (3–4) ||  || 35,032 || 40–40 || Angel Stadium of Anaheim || W1 || bgcolor="ffbbbb" | −
|- align="center" bgcolor="#bbffbb"
| 81 || June 28 || Nationals || 11–5 || Takahashi (2–1) || Balester (1–1) ||  || 41,029 || 41–40 || Angel Stadium of Anaheim || W2 || bgcolor="ffbbbb" | −
|- align="center" bgcolor="#bbffbb"
| 82 || June 29 || Nationals || 1–0 || Haren (8–5) || Zimmermann (5–7) || Walden (18) || 35,258 || 42–40 || Angel Stadium of Anaheim || W3 || bgcolor="ffbbbb" | −
|-

|- align="center" bgcolor="#ffbbbb"
| 83 || July 1 || Dodgers || 5–0 || Kuroda (6–9) || Chatwood (5–5) ||  || 41,253 || 42–41 || Angel Stadium of Anaheim || L1 || bgcolor="ffbbbb" | −2
|- align="center" bgcolor="#bbffbb"
| 84 || July 2 || Dodgers || 7–1 || Weaver (10–4) || Kershaw (8–4) ||  || 42,232 || 43–41 || Angel Stadium of Anaheim || W1 || bgcolor="ffbbbb" | −1
|- align="center" bgcolor="#bbffbb"
| 85 || July 3 || Dodgers || 3–1 || Santana (4–8) || Billingsley (7–7) || Walden (19) || 42,536 || 44–41 || Angel Stadium of Anaheim || W2 || bgcolor="f2f2f2" | 0
|- align="center" bgcolor="#bbffbb"
| 86 || July 4 || Tigers || 5–1 || Piñeiro (4–3) || Furbush (1–2) ||  || 43,012 || 45–41 || Angel Stadium of Anaheim || W3 || bgcolor="f2f2f2" | 0
|- align="center" bgcolor="#bbffbb"
| 87 || July 5 || Tigers || 1–0 || Haren (9–5) || Verlander (11–4) ||  || 39,006 || 46–41 || Angel Stadium of Anaheim || W4 || bgcolor="f2f2f2" | 0
|- align="center" bgcolor="#ffbbbb"
| 88 || July 6 || Tigers || 5–4 || Penny (6–6) || Takahashi (2–2) || Valverde (21) || 31,549 || 46–42 || Angel Stadium of Anaheim || L1 || bgcolor="ffbbbb" | −1
|- align="center" bgcolor="#bbffbb"
| 89 || July 7 || Mariners || 5–1 || Weaver (11–4) || Fister (3–10) ||  || 41,223 || 47–42 || Angel Stadium of Anaheim || W1 || bgcolor="ffbbbb" | −1
|- align="center" bgcolor="#bbffbb"
| 90 || July 8 || Mariners || 4–3 || Walden (2–2) || Pauley (5–2) ||  || 40,161 || 48–42 || Angel Stadium of Anaheim || W2 || bgcolor="ffbbbb" | −1
|- align="center" bgcolor="#bbffbb"
| 91 || July 9 || Mariners || 9–3 || Piñeiro (5–3) || Pineda (8–6) ||  || 44,111 || 49–42 || Angel Stadium of Anaheim || W3 || bgcolor="ffbbbb" | −1
|- align="center" bgcolor="#bbffbb"
| 92 || July 10 || Mariners || 4–2 || Haren (10–5) || Pauley (5–3) || Walden (20) || 39,505 || 50–42 || Angel Stadium of Anaheim || W4 || bgcolor="ffbbbb" | −1
|- align="center" bgcolor="bbcaff"
|colspan="3" bgcolor="#bbcaff"| July 12: All-Star Game (NL wins—Box) || 5–1 || Clippard (WAS) || C. J. Wilson (TEX) || B. Wilson (SF) || 47,994 || || Chase Field || colspan=2 |  Phoenix, Arizona
|- align="center" bgcolor="#ffbbbb"
| 93 || July 15 || @ Athletics || 5–3 || McCarthy (2–5) || Haren (10–6) || Bailey (9) || 18,470 || 50–43 || O.co Coliseum || L1 || bgcolor="ffbbbb" | −
|- align="center" bgcolor="#bbffbb"
| 94 || July 16 || @ Athletics || 4–2 || Weaver (12–4) || Cahill (8–8) || Walden (21) ||  || 51–43 || O.co Coliseum || W1 || bgcolor="ffbbbb" | −2
|- align="center" bgcolor="#ffbbbb"  
| 95 || July 16 || @ Athletics || 4–3 (10) || Ziegler (3–1) || Thompson (1–3) ||  || 27,379 || 51–44 || O.co Coliseum || L1 || bgcolor="ffbbbb" | −3
|- align="center" bgcolor="#ffbbbb"  
| 96 || July 17 || @ Athletics || 9–1 || Gonzalez (9–6) || Piñeiro (5–4) ||  || 26,115 || 51–45 || O.co Coliseum || L2 || bgcolor="ffbbbb" | −4
|- align="center" bgcolor="#ffbbbb"  
| 97 || July 19 || Rangers || 7–0 || Ogando (10–3) || Chatwood (5–6) ||  || 43,103 || 51–46 || Angel Stadium of Anaheim || L3 || bgcolor="ffbbbb" | −5
|- align="center" bgcolor="#bbffbb"
| 98 || July 20 || Rangers || 9–8 || Takahashi (3–2) || Hunter (1–1) || Walden (22) || 40,052 || 52–46 || Angel Stadium of Anaheim || W1 || bgcolor="ffbbbb" | −4
|- align="center" bgcolor="#bbffbb"
| 99 || July 21 || Rangers || 1–0 || Weaver (13–4) || Wilson (10–4) || Walden (23) || 38,315 || 53–46 || Angel Stadium of Anaheim || W2 || bgcolor="ffbbbb" | −3
|- align="center" bgcolor="#bbffbb"
| 100 || July 22 || @ Orioles || 6–1 || Santana (5–8) || Simón (2–3) || Takahashi (1) || 24,823 || 54–46 || Oriole Park at Camden Yards || W3 || bgcolor="ffbbbb" | −3
|- align="center" bgcolor="#ffbbbb" 
| 101 || July 23 || @ Orioles || 3–2 || Bergesen (2–6) || Piñeiro (5–5) || Gregg (16) || 20,311 || 54–47 || Oriole Park at Camden Yards || L1 || bgcolor="ffbbbb" | −4
|- align="center" bgcolor="#bbffbb"
| 102 || July 24 || @ Orioles || 9–3 || Chatwood (6–6) || Guthrie (4–14) ||  || 15,676 || 55–47 || Oriole Park at Camden Yards || W1 || bgcolor="ffbbbb" | −3
|- align="center" bgcolor="#ffbbbb"
| 103 || July 25 || @ Indians || 3–2 || Walden (2–3) || Sipp (5–2) ||  || 19,384 || 55–48 || Progressive Field || L1 || bgcolor="ffbbbb" | −4
|- align="center" bgcolor="#bbffbb"
| 104 || July 26 || @ Indians || 2–1 || Weaver (14–4) || Tomlin (11–5) || Walden (24) || 19,430 || 56–48 || Progressive Field || W1 || bgcolor="ffbbbb" | −3
|- align="center" bgcolor="#bbffbb"
| 105 || July 27 || @ Indians || 3–1 || Santana (6–8)** || Huff (1–1) ||  || 21,546 || 57–48 || Progressive Field || W2 || bgcolor="ffbbbb" | −2
|- align="center" bgcolor="#bbffbb"
| 106 || July 28 || @ Tigers || 12–7 || Cassevah (1–0) || Penny (7–8) ||  || 33,489 || 58–48 || Comerica Park || W3 || bgcolor="ffbbbb" | −2
|- align="center" bgcolor="#ffbbbb"
| 107 || July 29 || @ Tigers || 12–2 || Porcello (11–6) || Chatwood (6–7) ||  || 40,551 || 58–49 || Comerica Park || L1 || bgcolor="ffbbbb" | −2
|- align="center" bgcolor="#bbffbb"
| 108 || July 30 || @ Tigers || 5–1 || Haren (11–6) || Turner (0–1) ||  || 40,753 || 59–49 || Comerica Park || W1 || bgcolor="ffbbbb" | −2
|- align="center" bgcolor="#ffbbbb"
| 109 || July 31 || @ Tigers || 3–2 || Verlander (15–5) || Weaver (14–5) || Valverde (28) || 36,878 || 59–50 || Comerica Park || L1 || bgcolor="ffbbbb" | −2
|-
| colspan=12 | **Ervin Santana threw the ninth no-hitter in Angels history.
|-

|- align="center" bgcolor="#bbffbb"
| 110 || August 2 || Twins || 5–1 || Santana (7–8) || Duensing (8–9) ||  || 37,565 || 60–50 || Angel Stadium of Anaheim || W1 || bgcolor="ffbbbb" | −1
|- align="center" bgcolor="#ffbbbb"
| 111 || August 3 || Twins || 11–4 || Swarzak (3–3) || Piñeiro (5–6) ||  || 35,555 || 60–51 || Angel Stadium of Anaheim || L1 || bgcolor="ffbbbb" | −1
|- align="center" bgcolor="#bbffbb"
| 112 || August 4 || Twins || 7–1 || Haren (12–6) || Liriano (7–9) ||  || 40,365 || 61–51 || Angel Stadium of Anaheim || W1 || bgcolor="ffbbbb" | −1
|- align="center" bgcolor="#bbffbb"
| 113 || August 5 || Mariners || 1–0 (10) || Walden (3–3) || Cortes (0–1) ||  || 38,727 || 62–51 || Angel Stadium of Anaheim || W2 || bgcolor="ffbbbb" | −1
|- align="center" bgcolor="#ffbbbb"
| 114 || August 6 || Mariners || 5–1 || Beavan (3–2) || Chatwood (6–8) ||  || 42,017 || 62–52 || Angel Stadium of Anaheim || L1 || bgcolor="ffbbbb" | −1
|- align="center" bgcolor="#bbffbb"
| 115 || August 7 || Mariners || 2–1 || Santana (8–8) || Hernández (10–10) || Walden (25) || 38,823 || 63–52 || Angel Stadium of Anaheim || W1 || bgcolor="ffbbbb" | −1
|- align="center" bgcolor="#bbffbb"
| 116 || August 9 || @ Yankees || 6–4 || Downs (6–2) || Rivera (1–2) || Walden (26) || 46,466 || 64–52 || Yankee Stadium || W2 || bgcolor="ffbbbb" | −
|- align="center" bgcolor="#ffbbbb"
| 117 || August 10 || @ Yankees || 9–3 || Nova (11–4) || Richards (0–1) ||  || 46,967 || 64–53 || Yankee Stadium || L1 || bgcolor="ffbbbb" | −
|- align="center" bgcolor="#ffbbbb"
| 118 || August 11 || @ Yankees || 6–5 || Soriano (2–1) || Rodney (2–4) || Rivera (30) || 47,431 || 64–54 || Yankee Stadium || L2 || bgcolor="ffbbbb" | −2
|- align="center" bgcolor="#bbffbb"
| 119 || August 12 || @ Blue Jays || 5–1 || Santana (9–8) || Morrow (8–7) ||  || 24,731 || 65–54 || Rogers Centre || W1 || bgcolor="ffbbbb" | −2
|- align="center" bgcolor="#ffbbbb"
| 120 || August 13 || @ Blue Jays || 11–2 || Romero (11–9) || Weaver (14–6) ||  || 27,185 || 65–55 || Rogers Centre || L1 || bgcolor="ffbbbb" | −3
|- align="center" bgcolor="#ffbbbb"
| 121 || August 14 || @ Blue Jays || 5–4 (10) || Rauch (5–3) || Rodney (2–5) ||  || 23,355 || 65–56 || Rogers Centre || L2 || bgcolor="ffbbbb" | −4
|- align="center" bgcolor="#ffbbbb"
| 122 || August 15 || Rangers || 8–4 || Ogando (12–5) || Cassevah (1–1) ||  || 36,663 || 65–57 || Angel Stadium of Anaheim || L3 || bgcolor="ffbbbb" | −5
|- align="center" bgcolor="#ffbbbb"
| 123 || August 16 || Rangers || 7–3 || Holland (11–4) || Chatwood (6–9) ||  || 43,711 || 65–58 || Angel Stadium of Anaheim || L4 || bgcolor="ffbbbb" | −6
|- align="center" bgcolor="#ffbbbb"
| 124 || August 17 || Rangers || 4–3 || Wilson (12–5) || Santana (9–9) || Feliz (24) || 36,581 || 65–59 || Angel Stadium of Anaheim || L5 || bgcolor="ffbbbb" | −7
|- align="center" bgcolor="#bbffbb"
| 125 || August 18 || Rangers || 2–1 || Ramírez (1–0) || Adams (1–2) ||  || 41,123 || 66–59 || Angel Stadium of Anaheim || W1 || bgcolor="ffbbbb" | −6
|- align="center" bgcolor="#bbffbb"
| 126 || August 19 || Orioles || 8–3 || Haren (13–6) || Reyes (6–10) ||  || 38,156 || 67–59 || Angel Stadium of Anaheim || W2 || bgcolor="ffbbbb" | −6
|- align="center" bgcolor="#bbffbb"
| 127 || August 20 || Orioles || 9–8 (12) || Rodney (3–5) || Gregg (0–2) ||  || 43,201 || 68–59 || Angel Stadium of Anaheim || W3 || bgcolor="ffbbbb" | −5
|- align="center" bgcolor="#bbffbb"
| 128 || August 21 || Orioles || 7–1 || Williams (1–0) || Matusz (1–6) ||  || 37,148 || 69–59 || Angel Stadium of Anaheim || W4 || bgcolor="ffbbbb" | −4
|- align="center" bgcolor="#bbffbb"
| 129 || August 23 || White Sox || 5–4 || Walden (4–3) || Frasor (3–3) ||  || 37,728 || 70–59 || Angel Stadium of Anaheim || W5 || bgcolor="ffbbbb" | −
|- align="center" bgcolor="#bbffbb"
| 130 || August 24 || White Sox || 8–0 || Weaver (15–6) || Stewart (1–3) ||  || 36,610 || 71–59 || Angel Stadium of Anaheim || W6 || bgcolor="ffbbbb" | −
|- align="center" bgcolor="ffbbbb"
| 131 || August 26 || @ Rangers || 11–7 || Holland (12–5) || Haren (13–7)  ||  || 38,256 || 71–60 || Rangers Ballpark in Arlington || L1 || bgcolor="ffbbbb" | −3
|- align="center" bgcolor="#bbffbb"
| 132 || August 27 || @ Rangers || 8–4 || Santana (10–9) || Wilson (13–6) || Takahashi (2) || 48,453 || 72–60 || Rangers Ballpark in Arlington || W1 || bgcolor="ffbbbb" | −2
|- align="center" bgcolor="ffbbbb"
| 133 || August 28 || @ Rangers || 9–5 || Oliver (5–5) || Weaver (15–7) ||  || 40,018 || 72–61 || Rangers Ballpark in Arlington || L1 || bgcolor="ffbbbb" | −3
|- align="center" bgcolor="ffbbbb"
| 134 || August 29 || @ Mariners || 5–3 || Wilhelmsen (2–0) || Takahashi (3–3) || League (32) || 16,990 || 72–62 || Safeco Field || L1 || bgcolor="ffbbbb" | −
|- align="center" bgcolor="#bbffbb"
| 135 || August 30 || @ Mariners || 13–6 || Williams (2–0) || Vasquez (1–1) ||  || 15,536 || 73–62 || Safeco Field || W1 || bgcolor="ffbbbb" | −
|- align="center" bgcolor="ffbbbb"
| 136 || August 31 || @ Mariners || 2–1 || Hernández (13–11) || Haren (13–8) ||  || 18,520 || 73–63 || Safeco Field || L1 || bgcolor="ffbbbb" | −
|-

|- align="center" bgcolor="#bbffbb"
| 137 || September 1 || @ Mariners || 4–3 || Santana (11–9) || Furbush (3–7) || Walden (27) || 19,453 || 74–63 || Safeco Field || W1 || bgcolor="ffbbbb" | −
|- align="center" bgcolor="ffbbbb"
| 138 || September 2 || Twins || 13–5 || Pavano (7–11) || Chatwood (6–10) ||  || 37,198 || 74–64 || Angel Stadium of Anaheim || L1 || bgcolor="ffbbbb" | −
|- align="center"  bgcolor="#bbffbb"
| 139 || September 3 || Twins || 10–6 || Weaver (16–7) || Dumatrait (1–3) ||  || 39,102 || 75–64 || Angel Stadium of Anaheim || W1 || bgcolor="ffbbbb" | −
|- align="center" bgcolor="#bbffbb"
| 140 || September 4 || Twins || 4–1 || Piñeiro (6–6) || Slowey (0–4) || Walden (28) || 36,638 || 76–64 || Angel Stadium of Anaheim || W2 || bgcolor="ffbbbb" | −
|- align="center" bgcolor="#bbffbb"
| 141 || September 5 || Mariners || 7–3 || Haren (14–8) || Vasquez (1–2) ||  || 35,497 || 77–64 || Angel Stadium of Anaheim || W3 || bgcolor="ffbbbb" | −
|- align="center" bgcolor="ffbbbb"
| 142 || September 6 || Mariners || 2–1 || Hernández (14–11) || Santana (11–10) || League (33) || 36,533 || 77–65 || Angel Stadium of Anaheim || L1 || bgcolor="ffbbbb" | −
|- align="center" bgcolor="#bbffbb"
| 143 || September 7 || Mariners || 3–1 || Williams (3–0) || Furbush (3–8) || Walden (29) || 37,459 || 78–65 || Angel Stadium of Anaheim || W1 || bgcolor="ffbbbb" | −
|- align="center" bgcolor="#bbffbb"
| 144 || September 9 || Yankees || 2–1 || Walden (5–3) || Laffey (2–2) ||  || 41,014 || 79–65 || Angel Stadium of Anaheim || W2 || bgcolor="ffbbbb" | −
|- align="center" bgcolor="#bbffbb"
| 145 || September 10 || Yankees || 6–0 || Haren (14–8) || Sabathia (19–8) ||  || 42,774 || 80–65 || Angel Stadium of Anaheim || W3 || bgcolor="ffbbbb" | −
|- align="center" bgcolor="ffbbbb"
| 146 || September 11 || Yankees || 6–5 || Wade (5–0) || Santana (11–11) || Rivera (40) || 42,581 || 80–66 || Angel Stadium of Anaheim || L1 || bgcolor="ffbbbb" | −
|- align="center" bgcolor="ffbbbb"
| 147 || September 12 || @ Athletics || 6–3 || Gonzalez (13–12) || Piñeiro (6–7) ||  || 12,858 || 80–67 || O.co Coliseum || L2 || bgcolor="ffbbbb" | −3
|- align="center"  bgcolor="#bbffbb"
| 148 || September 13 || @ Athletics || 6–3 || Takahashi (4–3) || De Los Santos (2–2) || Walden (30) || 13,212 || 81–67 || O.co Coliseum || W1 || bgcolor="ffbbbb" | −3
|- align="center" bgcolor="#bbffbb"
| 149 || September 14 || @ Athletics || 4–1 || Weaver (17–7) || Harden (4–3) || Walden (31) || 14,743 || 82–67 || O.co Coliseum || W2 || bgcolor="ffbbbb" | −3
|- align="center" bgcolor="ffbbbb"
| 150 || September 16 || @ Orioles || 8–3 || Hunter (4–4) || Haren (15–9) ||  || 24,022 || 82–68 || Oriole Park at Camden Yards || L1 || bgcolor="ffbbbb" | −
|- align="center" bgcolor="ffbbbb"
| 151 || September 17 || @ Orioles || 6–2 || Britton (10–10) || Santana (11–12) ||  || 31,099 || 82–69 || Oriole Park at Camden Yards || L2 || bgcolor="ffbbbb" | −
|- align="center" bgcolor="#bbffbb"
| 152 || September 18 || @ Orioles || 11–2 || Weaver (18–7) || Simón (4–9) ||  || 27,471 || 83–69 || Oriole Park at Camden Yards || W1 || bgcolor="ffbbbb" | −
|- align="center" bgcolor="ffbbbb"
| 153 || September 19 || @ Blue Jays || 3–2 || Janssen (6–0) || Downs (6–3) ||  || 11,178 || 83–70 || Rogers Centre || L1 || bgcolor="ffbbbb" | −5
|- align="center" bgcolor="#bbffbb"
| 154 || September 20 || @ Blue Jays || 10–6 || Piñeiro (7–7) || Cecil (4–10) || Downs (1) || 13,514 || 84–70 || Rogers Centre || W1 || bgcolor="ffbbbb" | −5
|- align="center" bgcolor="#bbffbb"
| 155 || September 21 || @ Blue Jays || 7–2 || Haren (16–9) || McGowan (0–1) ||  || 14,784 || 85–70 || Rogers Centre || W2 || bgcolor="ffbbbb" | −5
|- align="center" bgcolor="ffbbbb"
| 156 || September 22 || @ Blue Jays || 4–3 (12) || Camp (5–3) || Richards (0–2) ||  || 22,769 || 85–71 || Rogers Centre || L1 || bgcolor="ffbbbb" | −5
|- align="center" bgcolor="ffbbbb"
| 157 || September 23 || Athletics || 3–1 || Gonzalez (15–12) || Weaver (18–8) || Bailey (22) || 39,217 || 85–72 || Angel Stadium of Anaheim || L2 || bgcolor="ffbbbb" | −6
|- align="center" bgcolor="#bbffbb"
| 158 || September 24 || Athletics || 4–2 || Williams (4–0) || Moscoso (8–10) || Walden (32) || 41,113 || 86–72 || Angel Stadium of Anaheim || W1 || bgcolor="ffbbbb" | −6
|- align="center" bgcolor="ffbbbb"
| 159 || September 25 || Athletics || 6–5 || De Los Santos (3–2) || Walden (5–4) || Bailey (23) || 40,794 || 86–73 || Angel Stadium of Anaheim || L1 || bgcolor="ffbbbb" | −7
|- align="center" style="background: #780000; color: white"
| 160 || September 26* || Rangers || 4–3 || Hamburger (1–0) || Haren (16–10) || Feliz (31) || 39,716 || 86–74 || Angel Stadium of Anaheim || L2 ||  −8
|- align="center" bgcolor="ffbbbb"
| 161 || September 27 || Rangers || 10–3 || Lewis (14–10) || Chatwood (6–11) ||  || 39,529 || 86–75 || Angel Stadium of Anaheim || L3 || bgcolor="ffbbbb" | −9
|- align="center" bgcolor="ffbbbb"
| 162 || September 28 || Rangers || 3–1 || Adams (5–4) || Walden (5–5) || Feliz (32) || 39,612 || 86–76 || Angel Stadium of Anaheim || L4 || bgcolor="ffbbbb" | −10
|-
| colspan=12 | *The Angels were officially eliminated from the AL West race on September 23 and from playoff contention on September 26.
|-

Regular Season Schedule (calendar style) 
Regular Season Schedule (sortable text)

Standings

Divisional standings

Record vs. opponents

Roster

Player statistics

Hitting statistics
Note: Pos = Position; G = Games played; AB = At bats; R = Runs; H = Hits; 2B = Doubles; 3B = Triples; HR = Home runs; RBI = Runs batted in; TB = Total bases; BB = Base on balls; SO = Strikeouts; SB = Stolen bases; CS = Caught Stealing; OBP = On base percentage; SLG = Slugging; AVG = Batting average
‡Traded/Released/DFA mid-season.

Farm system

References

External links

2011 Los Angeles Angels of Anaheim Official Site
2011 Los Angeles Angels of Anaheim at Baseball Reference 

Los Angeles Angels seasons
Los Angeles Angels of Anaheim
Los
|}